The Norwegian Graphical Union (NGF) was a trade union representing workers in the printing industry and related trades, in Norway.

History
The union was founded in 1967, when the Norwegian Union of Typographers merged with the Norwegian Union of Bookbinders and Cardboard Workers, and the Norwegian Lithographers' and Chemographers' Union.  It affiliated to the Norwegian Confederation of Trade Unions.  By 1996, it had 14,210 members, and by 2005, it had declined to 12,200, of whom, almost half were retired.

In 2006, the union merged into the United Federation of Trade Unions.

Presidents
1967: Roald Halvorsen
1967: Arne Li
1971: Reidar Langås
1974: Arild Kalvik
1983: Kjell Christoffersen
1991: Finn Erik Thoresen
2001: Roger Andersen
2005: Anders Skattkjær

References

Defunct trade unions of Norway
Norwegian Confederation of Trade Unions
Organisations based in Oslo
1967 establishments in Norway
Printing trade unions
Trade unions established in 1967
Trade unions disestablished in 2006